The Girl and the Legend is a 1957 German historical drama film directed by Josef von Báky and starring Romy Schneider, Horst Buchholz and Erich Ponto. It was shot at the Bavaria Studios in Munich. The film's sets were designed by the art director Hein Heckroth.

Cast
Romy Schneider as Maud
Horst Buchholz as Tom
Erich Ponto as Daniel Defoe
Mathias Wieman as King George II
Magda Schneider as Mrs. Cantley
Gustav Knuth as Carlton Heep
Rudolf Vogel as Mr. Herodes Pum
Elisabeth Flickenschildt as Miss Hackett
Günther Lüders as Mr. Drinkwater
Heinrich Gretler as Mr. Wilde
Roland Kaiser as Ben
Wolfgang Condrus as Charly
Urs Hess as Jim
Gert Fröbe as Mr. Gillis

References

Bibliography
 Petzel, Michael. Die junge Romy: Reifezeit eines Stars. Schwarzkopf & Schwarzkopf, 2002.

External links

West German films
1957 films
Films directed by Josef von Báky
German films based on plays
Films set in the 1730s
Films set in London
Biographical films about writers
German historical drama films
1950s historical drama films
1957 drama films
1950s German films
Films shot at Bavaria Studios